is a station on the Tokyo Kyuko Electric Railway Oimachi Line located in southeast Tokyo, Japan.

Station layout
A ground-level island platform.  The platform is one car-length shorter than the train, so the doors in the westernmost (Futako-Tamagawa end) car do not open.  There is a short platform on the other side of the level crossing at the western end of the station, for use only by the conductors of Ōimachi-bound trains.

History
November 1, 1929 Opened.

Bus services
 bus stop
Tokyu Bus
<園02>Setagawa Ward Civilian Hall - Agricultural College - Yoga Sta. - Kuhombutsu Sta. mae - Den-en-Chofu Sta.

References

Railway stations in Tokyo
Railway stations in Japan opened in 1929
Tokyu Oimachi Line
Stations of Tokyu Corporation